Verbena canadensis (syn. Glandularia canadensis), commonly known as rose mock vervain, rose verbena, clump verbena or rose vervain is a perennial herbaceous flowering plant in the verbena family (Verbenaceae) with showy pink to purple flowers.. It is native to the eastern and south-central areas of the United States. This species is widely cultivated as an ornamental, and naturalized populations have been established outside its native range, such as in the northeastern U.S.

Description
Roots will form where stems touch the ground, and over time the plant will spread to form a low mound. Leaves, up to long, are dark green on the upper surface and lighter green below. Leaves are semi-evergreen, opposite and pinnately-lobed. Flowers are pink to purple, and consist of a tubular corolla that opens up into 4 or 5 spreading lobes. Flowers bloom in the spring and can persist until fall. The plant attracts butterflies, rabbits, and deer.

Distribution and habitat
Its natural habitat is in sunny areas such as glades, forest openings, and on bluffs. It is tolerant of dry conditions.<ref>[http://www.missouriplants.com/Blueopp/Verbena_canadensis_page.html Verbena canadensis] MissouriPlants</ref> In some areas, the presence of Verbena canadensis'' is indicative of high-quality natural communities.

References

canadensis
Endemic flora of the United States
Flora of the North-Central United States
Flora of the Northeastern United States
Flora of the South-Central United States
Flora of the Southeastern United States
Garden plants of North America
Plants described in 1767
Taxa named by Carl Linnaeus